Statistics of Ekstraklasa for the 1996–97 season.

Overview
18 teams and played in the league and the title was won by Widzew Łódź.

League table

Results

Top goalscorers

References

External links
 Poland – List of final tables at RSSSF 

Ekstraklasa seasons
1996–97 in Polish football
Pol